Speedex Castings and Accessories Ltd. was a company manufacturing sports car bodies between 1958 and 1962 in Luton, Bedfordshire.

It was set up by Jem Marsh who left Firestone Tyres in 1958 to manage the Luton-based Sporting Motorists Agency which sold Dante tuning parts for Austin 7-based cars. He left in April 1958 to set up a similar company, SPEEDEX Castings and Accessories Ltd, in a former hat factory at 33 Jubilee Street.

The company moved on to larger premises in Windsor Street and produced the aluminium Speedex 750 body, followed by the glassfibre Silverstone and Sirocco GT Coupe.

Marsh went on to set up the Marcos Car Company with Frank Costin in 1962. The remaining Speedex bodies were purchased by Kew-based Cambridge Engineering who marketed the cars during 1962–3.

References

Further reading
historical information on Speedex
Biography of Jem Marsh and photo of the Speedex 750

Defunct motor vehicle manufacturers of the United Kingdom
Sports car manufacturers
Kit car manufacturers
Vehicle manufacturing companies established in 1958
Companies based in Luton
1958 establishments in England